Marion Frederick Hawthorne (August 24, 1928 – July 8, 2021) was an inorganic chemist who made contributions to the chemistry of boron hydrides, especially their clusters.

Early life and education
Hawthorne was born on August 24, 1928, in Fort Scott, Kansas. He received his elementary and secondary education in Kansas and Missouri. Prior to high school graduation, he entered the Missouri School of Mines and Metallurgy, Rolla, Missouri through examination as a chemical engineering student. He then transferred to Pomona College, where he received a B.A. degree in chemistry in 1949. While there he conducted research with Corwin Hansch. Hawthorne completed his Ph.D. in organic chemistry under Donald J. Cram at the University of California, Los Angeles in 1953. He conducted postdoctoral research at Iowa State University with George S. Hammond, before joining the Redstone Arsenal Research Division of the Rohm and Haas Company in Huntsville, Alabama.

Professional career
At the Redstone Arsenal, he worked on the chemistry of boron hydrides making several notable discoveries.  In 1962, he moved to the University of California, Riverside as professor of chemistry. He moved to the University of California, Los Angeles (UCLA) in 1969. In 1998, he was appointed University Professor of Chemistry at UCLA.  He then returned to his home state of Missouri as head of the International Institute of Nano and Molecular Medicine at University of Missouri.

Hawthorne was long associated with the journal Inorganic Chemistry, and was its longest serving editor-in-chief.

Research 

Hawthorne's contributions focused on the chemistry of boron hydride clusters.  He discovered dodecaborate anion (B12H122−) and metal complexes of the dicarbollide anion.  His group subsequently discovered the perhydroxylation of B12H122−.

Recognition
Hawthorne has been widely recognized, including with election to the US National Academy of Sciences.

 1992 – Honorary doctorate from the Faculty of Mathematics and Sciences at Uppsala University, Sweden
 1994 – Chemical Pioneer Award from the American Institute of Chemists
 2009 – Priestley Medal from the American Chemical Society
 2011 – National Medal of Science

External links 

 Interview with Richard Eisenberg for the Voices of Inorganic Chemistry (2011)

References

1928 births
2021 deaths
Hawthorne, M. Frederick
University of California, Los Angeles alumni
Pomona College alumni
Hawthorne, M. Frederick
University of California, Riverside faculty
Hawthorne, M. Frederick
Hawthorne, M. Frederick
Members of the United States National Academy of Sciences
People from Fort Scott, Kansas
Chemists from Missouri
National Medal of Science laureates
Inorganic chemists